The Jamkaran Mosque is one of the primary significant mosques in Jamkaran, a village in the outskirts of the city of Qom, Iran.

Overview and history
The mosque, six kilometers east of Qom, has long been a sacred place, at least since 373 A.H.,  17th of Ramadan (22 February 984 C.E.), when according to the mosque website, one Sheikh Hassan ibn Muthlih Jamkarani is reported to have met the 12th Imam along with the prophet Al-Khidr. Jamkarani was instructed that the land they were on was "noble" and that the owner — Hasan bin Muslim — was to cease cultivating it and finance the building of a mosque on it from the earnings he had accumulated from farming the land.

Sometime in the decade of 1995-2005, the mosque's reputation spread, and many pilgrims, particularly young people, began to come to it. In the rear of the mosque, there is a "well of requests" where it is believed the Twelfth Imam once "became miraculously unhidden for a brief shining moment of loving communion with his Creator."   Pilgrims tie small strings in a knot around the grids covering the holy well, which they hope will be received by the Imam Mahdi. Every morning custodians cut off the strings from the previous day.

Tuesday night is especially popular as it is said to be "the day the vision appeared and therefore the day of the week that [the Imam], although invisible, takes requests." The gathering "resembles a huge tailgate party where vendors set up in the parking lots and families set up picnic rugs and tens of thousands wander about the grounds as if waiting for the main event to happen."  More than a hundred thousand pilgrims sometimes pray outside the overflowing mosque for Maghrib prayer. In keeping with separation of the sexes, women are separated from men in their own special cordoned-off area and also have their own well. Also on Tuesdays, the mosque kitchen provides a free evening meal to thousands of poor people. 
One of the first acts of the government of President Mahmoud Ahmadinejad was to donate £10 million to the mosque, to fund plans to turn "the normal-sized Jamkaran mosque into a massive complex of prayer halls, minarets, car parks and ablutions." In recent years, overseers of the Jamkaran compound have become sensitive to its foreign images and have restricted foreign press from the main mosque and well.

On 4 January 2020, a blood-red flag symbolizing vengeance unfurled above the dome in response to the 2020 Baghdad International Airport airstrike. However, usually the red flag is raised during Muharram and it also flown in response to the COVID-19 pandemic in Iran whenever a milestone of casualties was reached.

A music video released in March 2022 for the song Salam Farmandeh was recorded in Jamkaran Mosque.

Gallery

See also
Twelfth Imam
Qom
Jamkaran
Raj`a

References

External links

Mosques in Iran
Populated places in Qom Province
Qom County
Safavid architecture